The Public Transport Council (PTC) is an independent regulatory statutory board under the Ministry of Transport of the Government of Singapore established on 14 August 1987 by the Public Transport Council Act of 1987.

PTC regulates the public bus and rapid transit network in areas such as fares and service standards. PTC is also authorised to issue and do amendments to bus service licences, and advises the Ministry of Transport on areas such as conditions on licensees and imposing of penalties on non-complying licensees.

As announced by Transport Minister Khaw Boon Wan, PTC will no longer be issuing penalties and fines despite multiple major breakdowns on the MRT system: "If you ask me, my preference is not to go back to this old system of penalties and fines because it created a very adversarial relationship between the regulator and the operator". It is not known how the PTC is going to maintain service standards without imposing any penalties.

Schemes

Free Pre-Peak Travel 
In 2013, the PTC introduced the Free Pre-Peak Travel ( FPPT) scheme to encourage commuters to make their morning travels earlier. The FPPT gave free trips to commuters who exited 18 city area stations before 7.45am on weekdays.

In 2017, after four years of the scheme, about seven percent of morning peak hours travels was shifted out of the morning peak hours. On 30 October 2017, after the 2017 Fare Review Exercise, PTC announced the scheme to be terminated on 29 December 2017.

Off-Peak Pass 
In 2015, the PTC started a trial on the Off-Peak Pass (OPP) scheme which allows passengers unlimited travel during the weekday off peak periods on both the bus and train networks. On 30 October 2017, after the 2017 Fare Review Exercise, PTC announced the trial to be terminated on 29 December 2017.

Criticisms
As the public transport fare regulator, the council was criticised on various occasions when it approved fare hike proposals from public transport operators. Some of its policies are deemed as pro-operators rather than pro-commuters. As such, the Workers' Party called for the dissolution of the council in favour of a not-for-profit corporation in the leadup to the 2006 general elections.

Fare adjustments
From 29 December 2017, commuters who started their journey on the rail network, before 7.45am on weekdays, get a discount of 50 cents or the amount of fare of the rail portion, whichever is lower.

The table chart major changes in fare :

See also 

 Transport in Singapore
 Civil Aviation Authority of Singapore
 Land Transport Authority
 Maritime and Port Authority of Singapore

References

External links
 

Statutory boards of the Singapore Government
Public transport in Singapore
1987 establishments in Singapore
Government agencies established in 1987
Regulation in Singapore